Henri Louis Michel (28 October 1947 – 24 April 2018) was a French football player and coach. He played as a midfielder for Nantes and the France national team, and later went on to coach various clubs and national teams all over the world. He coached France at the 1986 World Cup, where they reached the semi-final, eventually managing a third–place finish; he also helped the Olympic squad win a gold medal in the 1984 edition of the tournament.

Management career

France
Michel managed the French national team, guiding the gold medal at the 1984 Summer Olympics, and a third–place finish at the 1986 World Cup.

Cameroon
In 1994, he managed Cameroon.

Morocco
Michel had two stints with Morocco, the first being between 1995 and 2000.

His second stint, beginning in 2007, was short-lived with a poor showing at the Africa Cup of Nations 2008 where Morocco left in the first round. This resulted in his sacking from the post in February 2008.

Tunisia
From 2001 to 2002, he coached Tunisia. He was fired when Tunisia exited the 2002 African Cup of Nations in the first round after failing to score a single goal.

Ivory Coast
He joined the Ivorian national team after the departure of Robert Nouzaret around 2004. He managed with a young Ivorian team to come out first of their group ahead of Cameroon and Egypt, becoming the first coach to send Ivory Coast to the World Cup. In February 2006, He reached the Africa Cup of Nations final, but lost to Egypt on penalties. Later that year, he managed the Ivory Coast at the 2006 FIFA World Cup, where they played well but went home in the group stage after two defeats by Argentina and the Netherlands, before beating Serbia & Montenegro 3–2 in their final match.

El Zamalek
After the 2006 World Cup he joined the Egyptian club Zamalek. He left the club in 2007 to return to Morocco.

Sundowns
In 2008, he was appointed coach of Mamelodi Sundowns in South Africa. He left in March 2009 after being chased by an angry mob demanding his resignation.

El Zamalek
After two years turned back to El Zamalek on 30 August 2009 and on 30 November 2009 El Zamalek officials have fired the French coach due to negative results, the team was 15 points behind bitter rivals Al Ahly in the Egyptian league.

Raja Casablanca
Henri Michel was named Raja de Casablanca manager on 11 June 2010.

Equatorial Guinea
On 10 December 2010, Michel was hired head coach of the Equatorial Guinea to lead the team for 2012 Africa Cup of Nations they will co-host with Gabon. He suddenly resigned from his post on 19 October 2011, with the Africa Cup of Nations three months away, because he said he could not have the best players in the country, but five days later he was rehired thanks to the dismissal of Sports Minister Ruslan Obiang Nsue. On 21 December 2011, he resigned as coach of Equatorial Guinea again, citing interference from a "third party" as the reason for his departure.

Kenya
On 28 August 2012, Michel was named by the Football Kenya Federation (FKF) as the head coach of the Harambee Stars, taking over from James Nandwa, who was acting as manager on a caretaker basis. Barely four months later, he resigned, stating that he "could not find an amicable agreement within the deadlines regarding my compliance with several provisions of the contract". The FKF has also stated that they were disappointed with his attitude especially in looking down towards local tournaments, even describing the 2012 CECAFA Cup as useless and sent Nandwa to handle the team as interim coach.

Death
Henri Michel died on 24 April 2018, aged 70. The cause of death was not disclosed.

Honours
Orders
Chevalier of the Légion d'honneur: 1999

References

External links
 
 
French Football Federation Profile 
Henri Michel National record - Kenya FoStats.com

1947 births
2018 deaths
Sportspeople from Aix-en-Provence
French footballers
Association football midfielders
Pays d'Aix FC players
FC Nantes players
Ligue 2 players
Ligue 1 players
France international footballers
1978 FIFA World Cup players
French football managers
France national under-21 football team managers
France national football team managers
Paris Saint-Germain F.C. managers
Cameroon national football team managers
Al Nassr FC managers
Morocco national football team managers
United Arab Emirates national football team managers
Aris Thessaloniki F.C. managers
Tunisia national football team managers
Raja CA managers
Ivory Coast national football team managers
Al-Arabi SC (Qatar) managers
Zamalek SC managers
Mamelodi Sundowns F.C. managers
Equatorial Guinea national football team managers
Kenya national football team managers
Ligue 1 managers
Saudi Professional League managers
Super League Greece managers
Botola managers
Qatar Stars League managers
Egyptian Premier League managers
Premier Soccer League managers
1986 FIFA World Cup managers
1994 FIFA World Cup managers
1998 African Cup of Nations managers
1998 FIFA World Cup managers
2000 African Cup of Nations managers
2002 African Cup of Nations managers
2006 Africa Cup of Nations managers
2006 FIFA World Cup managers
2008 Africa Cup of Nations managers
Olympic gold medalists for France
Olympic medalists in football
French expatriate football managers
French expatriate sportspeople in Cameroon
French expatriate sportspeople in Saudi Arabia
French expatriate sportspeople in Morocco
French expatriate sportspeople in the United Arab Emirates
French expatriate sportspeople in Greece
French expatriate sportspeople in Tunisia
French expatriate sportspeople in Ivory Coast
French expatriate sportspeople in Qatar
French expatriate sportspeople in South Africa
French expatriate sportspeople in Equatorial Guinea
French expatriate sportspeople in Kenya
Expatriate football managers in Cameroon
Expatriate football managers in Saudi Arabia
Expatriate football managers in Morocco
Expatriate football managers in the United Arab Emirates
Expatriate football managers in Greece
Expatriate football managers in Tunisia
Expatriate football managers in Ivory Coast
Expatriate football managers in Qatar
Expatriate soccer managers in South Africa
Expatriate football managers in Equatorial Guinea
Expatriate football managers in Kenya
Chevaliers of the Légion d'honneur
Footballers from Provence-Alpes-Côte d'Azur